is a former Japanese football player. He played for Japan national team.

Club career
Kaneko was born in Saitama on September 12, 1959. After graduating from high school, he joined Furukawa Electric in 1978. Initially, he did play in many games. The club won the 1982 JSL Cup. In 1985, he played as a regular player and the club won the 1985–86 Japan Soccer League and 1986 JSL Cup. He was also selected for the Best Eleven in 1985–86 and in 1986–87. The club won the 1986 Asian Club Championship, which was the first time the  Asian championships was won by a Japanese club. He retired in 1992.

National team career
In August 1979, Kaneko was selected Japan U-20 national team for 1979 World Youth Championship. On July 25, 1986, he debuted for Japan national team against Syria. He also played at 1986 Asian Games. In 1987, he was selected Japan for 1988 Summer Olympics qualification. He played 7 games and scored 1 goal for Japan until 1987.

Club statistics

National team statistics

References

External links
 
 
 Japan National Football Team Database

1959 births
Living people
Association football people from Saitama Prefecture
Japanese footballers
Japan youth international footballers
Japan international footballers
Japan Soccer League players
JEF United Chiba players
Footballers at the 1986 Asian Games
Association football defenders
Asian Games competitors for Japan